The Ovambo people, also called Aawambo, Ambo, Aawambo (Ndonga, Nghandjera, Kwambi, Kwaluudhi, Kolonghadhi, Mbalantu), or Ovawambo (Kwanyama), are a Bantu ethnic group native to Southern Africa, primarily modern Namibia. They are the single largest ethnic group in Namibia, accounting for about half of the population, and are one of Namibia’s most vibrant tribes. They have retained many aspects of their cultural practices, despite concerted efforts from Christian missionaries to wipe out what were believed to be ‘pagan practices’. They are also found in the southern Angolan province of Cunene, where they are more commonly referred to as "Ambo". The Ovambo consist of a number of kindred Bantu ethnic tribes who inhabit what was formerly  called Ovamboland. In Angola, they are a minority, accounting for about two percent of the total Angolan population.

There are about 2 million ethnic Ovambo, and they are predominantly Lutheran Christians (97%).

Demographics

The Ovambo people reside in the flat sandy grassy plains of north Namibia and the Cunene Province in south Angola, sometimes referred to as Ovamboland. These plains are generally flat, stoneless and at high altitude.

Water courses, known as oshanas, irrigate the area. In the northern regions of Ovamboland is tropical vegetation sustained by abundant but seasonal rainfall that floods the region into temporary lakes and islands. In dry season, these pools of water empty out. The Ovambo have adapted to the widely varying seasonal weather patterns with their housing, agriculture, and livestock practices.

The Ovambo people are a Bantu-speaking group. In Namibia, these are the AaNdonga, Ovakwanyama, Aakwambi, Aangandjera, Aambalantu, Ovaunda, Aakolonkadhi, Aakwaluudhi and Aambandja. In Angola, they are the Ovakwanyama, Aakafima, Evale and Aandonga. The Ovakwanyama are the largest sub-tribe.

History
The Ovambo started migrating to their current location from the northeast around the 14th century from the Zambia region. They settled near the Angola-Namibia border then expanded further south in Namibia in the 17th century. They have a close cultural, linguistic and historical relationship to the Herero people found in more southern parts of Namibia, and Kavango people to their east settled around the Okavango River.

In contrast to most ethnic groups in Africa, the isolated, low-density pastoral nomadic lifestyle left the Ovambo people largely unaffected by the Swahili-Arab and European traders before the 19th century. When Germany established a colony in Namibia in 1884, they left the Ovambo people undisturbed. The Germans focused on the southern and coastal regions. After World War I, Namibia was annexed by the South African government into the Union of South Africa as the Territory of South West Africa. This brought major changes, with South African plantation, cattle breeding and mining operations entering the Ovamboland. The Portuguese colonial administration in Angola, who had previously focused on their coastal, northern and eastern operations, entered southern Angola to form a border with the expanding South African presence. The Ovambo people launched several armed rebellions against South African rule in the 1920s and 1930s, which were all suppressed by the Union Defence Force.

The South African administration in Namibia continued the so-called "Police Zone" in south, a region created by the Germans with a veterinary Red Line covering about two-thirds of the province later to become Namibia. Ovambo people were not allowed to move into the Police Zone, neither other tribes nor Europeans could move north without permits. This isolated the Ovambo people, preserving traditional authorities and reducing numbers of White farmers in the north. However, because of labor shortage in the Police Zone and South Africa, in part because of massacre of native Africans such as through the Herero and Namaqua genocide, the South African government allowed migrant wage labor. Numerous Ovambo people became migrant laborers in South African towns such as Cape Town and in the Police Zone, where they experienced segregation and lived under highly restrained human rights.

The South African Apartheid rule was brought into the Ovamboland in 1948. The South African government declared the Ovamboland as independent province in 1973, and appointed chiefs aligned with the South African government policies. The Ovambo people rejected these developments, and in 1975 the appointed chief minister of Ovamboland was assassinated. In conjunction with the armed SWAPO movement, Namibia and its Ovambo people gained independence in 1990 from South Africa.

Religion

Traditional religion
The traditional religion of the Ovambo people is the primary faith of less than 3%, as most state Christianity to be their primary faith. The Ovambo's traditional religion envisions a supreme being named Kalunga, with their rites and rituals centered around sacred fire like many ethnic groups in southwestern Africa. The Kalunga cosmology states that the Supreme Being created the first man and first woman, who had a daughter and two sons. It is the daughter's lineage that created Ovambo people, according to the traditional beliefs of the matrilineal Ovambo people.

The rituals involve elaborate fire making and keeping ceremonies, rain making dance, and rites have involved throwing herbs in the fire and inhaling the rising smoke. The head priest traditionally was the king of a tribe, and his role was in part to attend to the supernatural spirits and be the chief representative of the Ovambo tribe to the deities.

Christianity

Christianity arrived among the Ovambo people in the late 19th century. The first Finnish missionaries arrived in Ovamboland in the 1870s, and Ovambo predominantly converted and thereof have identified themselves as Lutheran Christians. The influence of the Finnish missions not only related to the religion, but cultural practices. For example, the typical dress style of the contemporary Ovambo women that includes a head scarf and loose full length maxi, is derived from those of the 19th-century Finnish missionaries.

The Ovambo now predominantly follow Christian theology, prayer rituals and festivities, but some of the traditional religious practices have continued, such as the use of ritual sacred fire. They also invoke their supreme creator Kalunga. Thus, the Ovamba have preferred a syncretic form of Christianity. Most weddings feature a combination of Christian beliefs and Ovambo traditions. Their traditional dancing is done to drumming (Oshiwambo folk music).

Society and culture

The traditional home is a complex of huts surrounded by a fence of large vertical poles linked by two horizontal poles on each side. The complex is a maze with two gates but it is easy to get lost within the homestead. Each hut generally has a different purpose, such as a Ondjugo (the woman of the homestead's hut) or Epata (kitchen area).

The Ovambo people lead a settled life, relying mostly on a combination of agriculture and animal husbandry. The staple crops have been millet and sorghum (iilyavala), and beans (omakunde) are another popular crop. In drier regions or seasons, pastoral activity with herds of cattle (eengobe/eenghwandabi), goats (iikombo/onakamela) and sheep (eedi) becomes more important. The animal husbandry is not for meat (ombelela), but primarily as a source of milk (omashini). Their food is supplemented by hunting, fishing, and gathering.

During the colonial era, the Ovambo were active in elephant (eenjaba) hunting for their tusks to supply the ivory demand, and they nearly hunted the elephants in their region to extinction.

Each Ovambo tribe had a hereditary chief who is responsible for the tribe. Many tribes adapted representation by having a council of headmen who run tribal affairs. Members of the royal family of the Owamboland are known as aakwanekamba, ovakwaluvala, ovakwamalanga, ovakwaanime, aakwanyoka and many more; only those who belong to this family by birth, through the maternal line, have a claim to chieftainship. The tribes figure their descent by a matrilineal kinship system, with hereditary chiefs arising from the daughter's children, not the son's. Polygyny is accepted, with the first wife recognized as the senior.

Ovambo brew a traditional liquor called ombike. It is distilled from fermented fruit mash and particularly popular in rural areas. The fruit to produce ombike are collected from makalani palms (Hyphaene petersiana), jackal berries (Diospyros mespiliformis), buffalo thorns (Ziziphus mucronata), bird plumes and cluster figs (Ficus racemosa). Ombike, with additives like sugar, is also brewed and consumed in urban areas. This liquor is then called omangelengele; it is more potent and sometimes poisonous. New Era, a Namibian English-language daily newspaper, reported that clothes, shoes, and tyres have been found to have been brewed as ingredients of omangelengele.

Ovambo clans 
The following table contains the names, areas, dialect names and the locations of the Ovambo according to T. E. Tirronen's Ndonga-English Dictionary. The table also contains information concerning the classification of noun class of the Proto-Bantu language for these words.

See also

 Herero people
 Himba people
 Nama people
 Oorlam people

References

Bibliography
 Karl Angebauer, Ovambo : Fünfzehn Jahre unter Kaffern, Buschleuten und Bezirksamtmännern, A. Scherl, Berlin, 1927, 257 p.
 P. H. Brincker, Unsere Ovambo-Mission sowie Land, Leute, Religion, Sitten, Gebräuche, Sprache usw. der Ovakuánjama-Ovámbo, nach Mitteilungen unserer Ovambo-Missionare zusammengestellt, Barmen, 1900, 76 p.
 Wolfgang Liedtke & Heinz Schippling, Bibliographie deutschsprachiger Literatur zur Ethnographie und Geschichte der Ovambo, Nordnamibia, 1840–1915, annotiert, Staatliches Museum für Völkerkunde Dresden, Dresde, 1986, 261 p.
Teddy Aarni, The Kalunga concept in Ovambo religion from 1870 onwards, University of Stockholm, Almquist & Wiksell, 1982, 166 p. .  
Leonard N. Auala, The Ovambo : our problems and hopes, Munger Africana Library, California Institute of Technology, Pasadena (Cal.), 1973, 32 p.
Allan D. Cooper, Ovambo politics in the twentieth century, University Press of America, Lanham, Md., 2001, 350 p. .
Gwyneth Davies, The medical culture of the Ovambo of Southern Angola and Northern Namibia, University of Kent at Canterbury, 1993 (thesis) 
Patricia Hayes, A history of the Ovambo of Namibia, c 1880-1935, University of Cambridge, 1992 (thesis)
Maija Hiltunen, Witchcraft and sorcery in Ovambo, Finnish Anthropological Society, Helsinki, 1986, 178 p. 
Maija Hiltunen, Good magic in Ovambo, Finnish Anthropological Society, Helsinki, 1993, 234 p. 
Matti Kuusi, Ovambo proverbs with African parallels, Suomalainen Tiedeakatemia, Helsinki, 1970, 356 p.
Carl Hugo Linsingen Hahn, The native tribes of South-West Africa : The Ovambo - The Berg Damara - The bushmen of South West Africa - The Nama - The Herero, Cape Times Ltd., Le Cap, 1928, 211 p.
Seppo Löytty, The Ovambo sermon : a study of the preaching of the Evangelical Lutheran Ovambo-Kavango Church in South West Africa, Luther-Agricola Society, Tampere (Finland), 1971, 173 p.
Giorgio Miescher, The Ovambo Reserve Otjeru (1911–1938) : the story of an African community in Central Namibia, Basler Afrika Bibliographien, Bâle, 2006, 22 p.
Ramiro Ladeiro Monteiro, Os ambós de Angola antes da independência, Instituto Superior de Ciências Sociais e Políticas, Lisbon, 1994, 311 p. (thesis, in )

External links

Language Map of Namibia

 
Ovambo
Ethnic groups in Namibia
Ethnic groups in Angola
Pastoralists